The 2012–13 Louisiana–Monroe Warhawks men's basketball team represented the University of Louisiana at Monroe during the 2012–13 NCAA Division I men's basketball season. The Warhawks, led by third year head coach Keith Richard, played their home games at Fant–Ewing Coliseum and were members of the West Division of the Sun Belt Conference. They finished the season 4–23, 3–17 in Sun Belt play to finish in last place in the West Division. The lost in the first round of the Sun Belt tournament to WKU.

Roster

Schedule

|-
!colspan=9| Regular season

|-
!colspan=9| 2013 Sun Belt tournament

References

Louisiana–Monroe Warhawks men's basketball seasons
Louisiana-Monroe